Edwin Walter Karpowich (September 28, 1912 – November 26, 2005) was an American football tackle who played for five seasons with the Pittsburgh Pirates of the National Football League. He was drafted by the Pittsburgh Pirates in the eighth round of the 66th pick in the 1936 NFL Draft. He played college football at Catholic University for the Catholic University Cardinals football team.

References

1912 births
2005 deaths
People from Duquesne, Pennsylvania
Players of American football from Pennsylvania
American football tackles
Catholic University Cardinals football players
Pittsburgh Pirates (football) players
Pittsburgh Steelers players
Buffalo Indians players